Robert Paverick (19 November 1912 – 25 May 1994) was a Belgian international footballer who played as defender.

Paverick played club football with Royal Antwerp and Beerschot VAC.

Paverick also earned 41 caps for the Belgian national side between 1935 and 1946. Paverick participated at the 1938 FIFA World Cup.

References

1912 births
1994 deaths
Belgian footballers
Belgium international footballers
Royal Antwerp F.C. players
K. Beerschot V.A.C. players
1938 FIFA World Cup players
People from Borgerhout
Association football defenders
Footballers from Antwerp